António Campos (29 May 1922 – 8 March 1999) was one of the pioneer filmmakers of visual anthropology in Portugal. Mainly using pure documentary techniques, he shot ethnographic films and tried docufiction. As well as in fictional films, he used the methods of direct cinema to portrait the life of ancient human communities (ethnofiction) of his country.

He started making films at the beginning of the sixties, at the same time as John Marshall (EU) and Michel Brault (Canada). Without knowing much about Jean Rouch, he followed his steps in an original way.

Biography
He integrated a troupe of theatre amateurs and worked at a state department office in Leiria. He got a subvention from the Calouste Gulbenkian Foundation in 1961, where he worked between 1970 and 1976, to study cinema in London. He took part in the 20th Century Film Festival, in Kracow, Poland.
He was the delegate in Portugal for the International Federation of Art Film and a member of the International Union of Independent Filmmakers (UNICI).

He started making films as an amateur. He shot ethnographic films with 16 mm light cameras and with no scientific purposes, like some of his Portuguese fellows, such as António Reis, Ricardo Costa or Pedro Costa, this one using small mini dv cameras, some years later. After the Carnation Revolution, he directed some theatrical fictional features in 35 mm, all with a strong anthropologic content. He was one of the representatives of the Portuguese Cinema Novo (or Novo Cinema), inspired by the French New Wave.

His film Gente da Praia da Vieira (People of Praia da Vieira), 1976, is, together with Trás-os-Montes, by António Reis and Margarida Cordeiro, and with Mau Tempo, Marés e Mudança (Changing Tides), by Ricardo Costa, one of the first docufictions of Portuguese cinema. Shot on the same year, these films, in the same genre, are preceded by Acto da Primavera (Act of Spring), 1962, by Manoel de Oliveira, and Ala-Arriba!, 1948, by José Leitão de Barros, a contemporary to Robert Flaherty. These films may also be classified as ethnofictions.

Filmography
Feature films
 1971 – Vilarinho das Furnas
 1974 – Falamos de Rio de Onor (We talk about Rio de Onor)
 1975 – Gente da Praia da Vieira (People of Praia da Vieira)
 1978 – Histórias Selvagens (Savage stories)
 1992 – Terra Fria (Cold Land)

Short and middle-length films
 1957 – O rio Liz
 1958 – Um tesouro
 1959 – O Senhor
 1961 – A Almadraba Atuneira
 1961 – Leiria 61
 1962 – Debussy
 1962 – Instrumentos musicais populares
 1962 – Colóquio do Comité Internacional dos Museus de Instrumentos Musicais
 1963 – Arte portuguesa contemporânea em Leiria
 1964 – Arte portuguesa contemporânea em Évora
 1964 – La fille mal gardée
 1964 – Incêndio no auditório antigo da Fundação Caloute Gulbenkian
 1964 – Instrumentos musicais portugueses II
 1965 – 100 anos de pintura francesa
 1965 – A invenção do amor
 1965 – Ouros do Peru
 1965 – Retratos das margens do rio Liz
 1966 – Arte do índio brasileiro
 1966 – Chagall – Breve a lua, lua cheia virá aparecer
 1966 – Inauguração do hospital S. João de Deus – Montemor-o-Novo
 1967 – Colagem
 1967 – Construção do Centro de Biologia de Oeiras da Fundação Calouste Gulbenkian
 1967 – Iniciação musical pelo método Orff
 1968 – Art portugais à Paris
 1968 – Arte portuguesa : do naturalismo aos nossos dias
 1968 – Festa de Natal dos funcionários da Fundação Calouste Gulbenkian
 1968 – O Principezinho
 1962–1969 – Obras de construção da sede, do museu e do grande auditório da Fundação Calouste Gulbenkian
 1970 – Raul Lino (not finished)
 1971 – Arte francesa depois de 1951
 1972 – Portugal e a Pérsia
 1973 – Rodin
 1974 – Museu Calouste Gulbenkian em Lisboa
 1975 – A Festa
 1976 – Paredes pintadas da revolução portuguesa
 1976 – Protecção arquitetónica sob a coordenação do Conselho da Europa (inacabado)
 1976 – 20º aniversário da morte de Calouste Gulgenkian
 1976 – Ex-votos portugueses
 1979 – Ti Miséria
 1987 – À descoberta de Leiria
 1993 – A Tremonha de Cristal (not finished)

Bibliography
  António Campos – anthology about the films and life of António Campos (2000 – Cinemateca Portuguesa)
  O Cais do Olhar by José de Matos-Cruz, Portuguese Cinematheque, 1999

See also
 Cinema of Portugal
 Cinema Novo
 Docufiction
 Visual anthropology
 Ethnographic film
 Salvage Ethnography
 Ethnofiction
 Direct cinema
 Cine season in Paris (Cinémathèque Française, 2002 – in French)
 List of directors associated with art film

External links
 

Portuguese film directors
1922 births
1999 deaths
People from Leiria